Fluorometholone acetate, also known as oxylone acetate and sold under the brand names Flarex, Florate, and Omnitrol, is a synthetic glucocorticoid corticosteroid and a corticosteroid ester, as well as a progestogen and progestogen ester. It is the C17α acetate ester of fluorometholone.

In addition to its potent corticosteroid activity, fluorometholone acetate is a progestogen. It has been studied in the treatment of breast cancer in women and has been found to be effective, producing remission in about 20% of women with advanced breast cancer at an oral dosage of 50 mg/day. However, it also produces severe Cushing's syndrome-like symptoms like plethora, moon face, glycosuria, marked weight gain, hypertension, and osteoporosis at this dosage due to its glucocorticoid activity.

See also
 Flumedroxone acetate
 Mometasone furoate

References

Corticosteroid esters
Glucocorticoids
Hormonal antineoplastic drugs
Progestogens